Chente Barrera is a tejano musician from San Antonio, Texas. He won the 2007 Grammy Award in the Best Tejano Album category as well as a Latin Grammy nomination for Sigue El Taconazo.

Discography
Puro Taconazo (1998)
Mi Inspiracion (2002)
Sigue El Taconazo (2006)

References

Tejano musicians
Grammy Award winners
Living people
Musicians from San Antonio
Year of birth missing (living people)